HMLYCP (Korean: 혜미리예채파; lit. Hyemiriyechaepa, stylized as HyeMiLeeYeChaePa) is an ongoing South Korean reality-variety show that airs on ENA from March 12, 2023, every Sunday at 19:50 (KST).

Background
HMLYCP is an entertainment show that captures the complex life of the Hye-mi-Ri Ye-Chae group struggling to settle comfortably in a remote mountain village. Under the slogan of 'from no ownership to full ownership', Lee Hye-ri, (G)I-dle's Cho Mi-yeon, Leejung Lee, Choi Ye-na, Le Sserafim's Kim Chae-won, and Patricia will provide fun by obtaining necessary supplies for housing and filling empty houses through various missions.

Cast and characters

Production
This is the first entertainment program from PD Lee Tae-kyung, who led Amazing Saturday, after moving to PD Kim Tae-ho's production company, TEO, and also the second project to launch by Kim's division on ENA along with Earth Globe Tour.

The program is scheduled to be broadcast in March.

The program was first announced on January 31, 2023, with the list of the cast Lee Hye-ri, Cho Mi-yeon, Leejung Lee, Choi Ye-na, Kim Chae-won, and Patricia. In choosing Lee Hye-ri, PD Lee Tae-kyung noted that he had met her for the second time after Amazing Saturday, "[She] has very outstanding abilities. It requires brains, but Hyeri shows it to an amazing extent. She is also a really great player who has the ability to create characters for the people around her. I really wanted to do the project again." This program marks Cho Mi-yeon's first fixed variety show.

On February 17, 2023, the first teaser of the show was released.

References

External links
  
 
 

2023 web series debuts
2023 South Korean television series debuts
ENA (South Korean TV channel) original programming
South Korean variety television shows
South Korean reality television series
Korean-language television shows